is a Japanese professional baseball player for the Fukuoka SoftBank Hawks of Nippon Professional Baseball (NPB). He previously played in NPB for the Hokkaido Nippon-Ham Fighters.

Career

Hokkaido Nippon-Ham Fighters
He debuted in 2012 with the Hokkaido Nippon-Ham Fighters. He had 7 runs.

While not accumulating enough plate appearances to qualify for the batting title, Kondo hit .413 in 2017. He was selected .

Through 2019, he batted .304/.402/.416.

Fukuoka SoftBank Hawks
On December 12, 2022, it was announced that Kondoh would sign with the Fukuoka SoftBank Hawks on a seven-year deal worth 5 billion yen overall. His uniform number will be 3.

International career 
Kondoh represented the Japan national baseball team in the 2017 Asia Professional Baseball Championship, 2019 exhibition games against Mexico, and 2019 WBSC Premier12.

On February 27, 2019, he was selected at the 2019 exhibition games against Mexico.

On October 1, 2019, he was selected at the 2019 WBSC Premier12. He led the tournament with nine walks.

References

External links

 Career statistics - NPB.jp
 8 近藤 健介 選手名鑑2021 - Hokkaido Nippon-Ham Fighters Official site

1993 births
Living people
Baseball people from Chiba Prefecture
Hokkaido Nippon-Ham Fighters players
Fukuoka SoftBank Hawks players
Nippon Professional Baseball catchers
Nippon Professional Baseball designated hitters
2019 WBSC Premier12 players
Baseball players at the 2020 Summer Olympics
2023 World Baseball Classic players
Olympic baseball players of Japan
Olympic medalists in baseball
Olympic gold medalists for Japan
Medalists at the 2020 Summer Olympics